Pavlidis (sometimes transliterated as Pavlides) is a Greek patronymic surname, equivalent to English Paulson. Notable people with the surname include:

 Aristotelis Pavlidis (born 1943), Greek politician and government minister
 Charalampos Pavlidis (born 1991), Greek association footballer
 Elias Pavlidis (born 1978), Greek boxer
 Giorgos Pavlidis (politician) (born 1956), Greek politician and regional governor
 Harry Pavlidis, Australian actor
 Jordanis Pavlides (1903–1985), British contract bridge player
 Panagiotis Pavlidis (died 1968), Greek shooter
 Theodosios Pavlidis (born 1934), computer scientist
 Spyros B. Pavlides, Greek geologist and professor
 Vangelis Pavlidis (born 1998), Greek association footballer
 Vasilios Pavlidis, born 1897, Greek wrestler

Greek-language surnames
Patronymic surnames
Surnames from given names